Khamkhins, also known as Ghalghaï, — historical Ingush ethnoterritorial society, which was located in the upper reaches of the Assa River. The Khamkhin society, like the Tsorin society, was formed from the former "Ghalghaï society" as a result of the transfer of rural government to Khamkhi.

The Khamkhin society continued to be synonymously called "Ghalghaï", after the name of the historical region "Ghalghaïche", on the territory of which the society was formed. The name "Ghalghaïche" in turn comes from the self-name of the Ingush - "Ghalghaï", which had a central and broad meaning in Ingushetia, being a common self-name for other Ingush societies, united by a common territory, common language and culture.

Geography 
In the west Khamkhins bordered with the Fyappins, in the north with the Galashians, in the east with the Tsorins, in the south with Georgia.

References

Bibliography 
 
 
 
 

Ingush societies